In mathematics, the Stone functor is a functor S: Topop → Bool, where Top is the category of topological spaces and Bool is the category of Boolean algebras and Boolean homomorphisms. It assigns to each topological space X the Boolean algebra S(X) of its clopen subsets, and to each morphism fop: X → Y in Topop (i.e., a continuous map f: Y → X) the homomorphism S(f): S(X) → S(Y) given by S(f)(Z) = f−1[Z].

See also
Stone's representation theorem for Boolean algebras
Pointless topology

References 
Abstract and Concrete Categories. The Joy of Cats . Jiri Adámek, Horst Herrlich, George E. Strecker.
 Peter T. Johnstone, Stone Spaces. (1982) Cambridge university Press 

Functors
Boolean algebra
General topology